Maria Grey  may refer to:

Maria Santos Grey, All My Children character
Maria Georgina Grey, educationalist and writer
Maria Grey Training College, teacher training college

See also
Maria Emma Gray, English conchologist and algologist
 Maria Freeman Gray (1832–1915), American educator, feminist and socialist